The following is a list of architects with a strong connection to the country of Sri Lanka (i.e., born in Sri Lanka, located in Sri Lanka or known primarily for their work in Sri Lanka).

A–M

 Cecil Balmond (born 1943)
 Geoffrey Bawa (1919-2003)
 Homi Billimoria (died 1956)

 Minnette De Silva (1918-1998)
 Lal Dharmapriya Gamage (born 1954)
 Valentine Gunasekara (1931-2017)

N–Z

 Ulrik Plesner (1861-1933)

 Justin Samarasekera (1916-2003)

 Oliver Weerasinghe (1907-1980)

See also

 Architecture of Sri Lanka
 List of architects
 List of Sri Lankan people

Sri Lanka
Architects